The 2017–18 season was West Bromwich Albion's eighth consecutive season in the Premier League and their 140th year in existence. This season the club participated in the Premier League, FA Cup and League Cup. Tony Pulis began the season as the team's head coach but a poor run of form led to his dismissal in November; he was succeeded by Alan Pardew later that month. On 2 April 2018, Pardew left West Brom by mutual consent. First team coach and former player Darren Moore took the stand until the end of the season.

The season covered the period from 1 July 2017 to 30 June 2018, with competitive matches played between August and May.

West Bromwich Albion's relegation to the Championship was confirmed on 8 May 2018, by virtue of Southampton earning a 1–0 away victory at fellow strugglers Swansea City.

Background

During the off-season, West Bromwich Albion made several improvements to their stadium, The Hawthorns. The club increased the number of wheelchair bays from 145 to 171 and installed Changing Places toilets, which are a special type of accessible toilet.  They also installed new giant screens inside the stadium, created a sensory area—to cater for young fans on the autism spectrum—and added "nostalgic" artwork to the concourses. The club's season ticket sales hit a seven-year high following a reduction in prices.

The club unveiled two new kits for the season, both of which were manufactured by Adidas. The home attire featured Albion's traditional navy blue and white vertical striped shirts, white shorts and white socks, though the backs and sleeves of the shirts were all navy blue. The away kit comprised white jerseys with red sleeves and red shorts and socks. The team's main shirt sponsor was Palm Eco-Town Development Company, whom West Bromwich Albion owner Guochuan Lai had served as general manager for over 20 years. The deal is thought to be worth £6 million to Albion over two years. Additionally, Albion's shirt sleeves were sponsored by online gambling provider 12BET, following a ruling by the Premier League that allowed clubs to add sponsor's logos to sleeves for the first time.

Assistant head coach Dave Kemp retired after spending over 40 years in football and was replaced by Gary Megson, who returned after having led Albion to the Premier League as manager in the 2000s. Jonny Evans was named as the club's new captain following the departure of Darren Fletcher to Stoke City. Shortly before the start of the new season, head coach Tony Pulis signed a one-year contract extension to keep him at the club until 2019.

Prior to the start of the season, sports journalists were unanimous in forecasting that Albion would finish in the bottom half of the Premier League but avoid relegation. The BBC's chief football writer, Phil McNulty, expected Tony Pulis to keep the team in the top division "with the minimum of fuss". Paul Merson of Sky Sports thought that Albion would be "solid" and "hard to beat" under Pulis and that without him the team would finish "five or so places" lower. ESPN's Iain Macintosh was more pessimistic, predicting that West Brom would finish only two places above the relegation zone. Oddschecker quoted odds of 750/1 on Albion winning the Premier League, while Paddy Power offered 6/1 on the club being relegated.

Transfers

Transfers in

Loans in

Transfers out

Loans out

Pre-season

Premier League Asia Trophy
West Bromwich Albion participated in the 2017 Premier League Asia Trophy in Hong Kong. It was the eighth edition of the Premier League Asia Trophy pre-season tournament and the first to feature four teams from the Premier League.

Teresa Herrera Trophy
The Teresa Herrera Trophy is a pre-season tournament that has been held annually in A Coruña, Spain, since 1946. The competition has sometimes featured four teams in a semi-final, final and third place play-off, while in other years —including 2017—only a single match final takes place. West Bromwich Albion were taking part in the competition for the first time and were defeated 2–0 by tournament hosts Deportivo de La Coruña, who were managed by former Albion head coach Pepe Mel.

Other friendlies
As of 22 June 2017, West Bromwich Albion have announced eight pre-season friendlies against Burton Albion, Walsall, Kidderminster Harriers, Port Vale, Bristol Rovers, Slough Town, Deportivo de La Coruña and Slavia Prague.

Premier League

West Bromwich Albion competed in the 2017–18 Premier League, the 26th season of English football's top division since its breakaway from the Football League in 1992. It was Albion's 12th season (8th consecutive) in the Premier League, 80th season in the top tier of English football and their 119th season of league football in all. West Brom's provisional fixture list was announced on 14 June 2017, but as is common for Premier League clubs, a number of the Saturday matches were subsequently rescheduled for live broadcast on television. The away games against Arsenal, Leicester City and Chelsea were selected for Sky Sports' Monday Night Football. Home matches against Stoke City, Manchester United and Arsenal and the away game at Manchester United were shown on Sky's Super Sunday programme. The rescheduling of the Arsenal home game caused the away game against West Ham United to be moved from New Year's Day (Monday) to the following evening, Tuesday 2 January, though the latter was not televised. The home game against Liverpool was switched to a lunchtime slot for coverage on Sky Sports and the away game versus Southampton was moved to a Saturday evening for screening on BT Sport.

August
Albion's opening match was at home to A.F.C. Bournemouth and featured debuts for new signing Jay Rodriguez and loanee Ahmed Hegazi. Rodriguez was named man of the match for his performance, while Hegazi scored the only goal of the game, thus becoming the first Baggies player to score on his Premier League debut since Thievy did so in 2014. Albion won their opening league match for the second successive season, the first time they had done so since 1992 and the first time in the top division since 1978. West Brom's first away match of the season also resulted in a 1–0 win, Hal Robson-Kanu scoring the second half goal against Burnley before being sent off for elbowing Matthew Lowton 12 minutes later.He is only the fourth player to come on as a sub, score and be sent off in the same Premier League game. Albion won their opening two league games of a top flight season for the first time since 1978–79. The team's 100% start came to an end following a 1–1 against Stoke City, though the draw did ensure that Albion remained unbeaten heading into the international break.

September

On 9 September 2017, West Brom's unbeaten record in the league came to an end after their 3–1 defeat away at Premier League newcomers Brighton & Hove Albion, who scored their first league goals and earned their first league win with the result. West Brom found themselves 3–0 down in the second half courtesy of a brace from Pascal Groß and a headed goal from Tomer Hemed. They did manage to pull a goal back through James Morrison late in the game, but it was not enough as West Brom fell to 9th in the table. Albion's goalless draw at home to West Ham United was Tony Pulis' 100th Premier League game in charge of the club, making him the first Baggies head coach to reach that milestone. On 25 September 2017, Gareth Barry became the all-time leading appearance maker in Premier League history after appearing against Arsenal, playing his 633th premier league game that made him surpass former Manchester United midfielder Ryan Giggs. He was also given the armband in this game. But the team lost 2–0 from a brace of Alexandre Lacazette, stretching Tony Pulis's awful managerial records at the Emirates Stadium. Five days later, they squandered a 2–0 lead they had taken in the opening 20 minuntes through Rondón and Evans'goals against Watford at home, being equalized by Richarlison in the 95th minute.

December
Albion lost 3–1 away at Stoke City in the 100th top flight meeting between the two sides. Salomón Rondón—in his 100th game for the club—scored Albion's consolation goal.

January

Albion started the new year with a tough visit to West Ham United, kicked off only 50 hours after the Arsenal clash, while West Ham had a week to spare due to their fixtures against Tottenham Hotspur was postponed. Club Chairman John Williams had requested a postpone for this match but dismissed by the FA. James McClean scores his first goal for club in 16 months, where last one also against West Ham. But a brace from Andy Carroll helped the home side bounce back, where the second goal being a 95-minute late winner. Jake Livermore was involved in an angry exchange with a fan after he was substituted in the second half, which was later confirmed that fan made remarks related to Livermore's abortive son. The midfielder was not charged by the FA while the fan later received an 'indefinite ban' from West Ham for home and away games. West Brom finally picked up their first league win across 5 months and 20 games at home against Brighton, defenders Jonny Evans and Craig Dawson each scored a header from corners respectively.

One week later, Albion earned a 1–1 draw away to Everton, but unfortunately the match is overshadowed as home midfielder James McCarthy suffered a broken leg after putting out a harsh tackle on Salomón Rondón and is set to miss out for a lengthy period. James McClean came on in the second half and made his 100th appearance for West Brom.

League table

Result summary

Results by matchday

Matches

Cup competitions

FA Cup
The FA Cup is English football's primary cup competition and was first held in 1871–72. West Bromwich Albion have won the competition five times, most recently in 1968; the 2017–18 season marks the 50th anniversary of that campaign as well as being Albion's 125th season in the FA Cup. As a Premier League club, Albion entered the 2017–18 FA Cup at the third round stage and were drawn away to either Exeter City or Forest Green Rovers. The former won the replayed tie 2–1  and advanced through to host WBA. Albion had not faced Exeter in any competition since a league match in 1993 and the two sides had never previously met in the FA Cup. The game finished 2–0 to the away side thanks to first half goals from Salomón Rondón and Jay Rodriguez, while Hal Robson-Kanu missed a penalty. Pardew got his first win in charge in this clash, which also ended Albion's 21-game winless run in all competitions.

West Bromwich Albion's fourth round match against Liverpool at Anfield was moved to a Saturday night slot for live screening on BT Sport. It became the first official game in the club's history to use a video assistant referee. The newly introduced technology did bring great impact to the process of the game, where referee Craig Pawson disallowed a West Brom goal and awarded Liverpool a penalty with VAR's assistance. But a brace from Jay Rodriguez and a Joël Matip own goal still saw a dramatic 3–2 victory to Albion. Albion were later eliminated by Southampton in the fifth round, albeit Rondon scoring a goal of the season contender.

EFL Cup
English football's secondary cup competition is the EFL Cup and is contested by the 92 clubs of the Premier League and English Football League. It was the 53rd season in which Albion took part in the competition formerly known as the Football League Cup, which they won at their first attempt in 1966 but had not won since. As one of the Premier League clubs not involved in European competition, Albion entered the 2017–18 EFL Cup at the second round stage, where they were drawn away to Accrington Stanley. Goals from Salomón Rondón, Matt Phillips and Jay Rodriguez—his first for the club—ensured Albion's progression into the next round, while Tom Dallison scored a late consolation for the home side. West Brom were captained by new signing Gareth Barry. In the third round, Albion faced Manchester City at home. Midfielder Claudio Yacob scored for the first time in almost three years but two goals from City's Leroy Sané meant that West Brom were eliminated from the competition.

Statistics

Appearances and goals
Last updated on 14 May 2018.

|-
!colspan="14"|Players who left during the season

Cards
Accounts for all competitions. Last updated on 18 December 2017.

Clean sheets
Last updated on 27 May 2018.

Legacy
The season was covered by the Channel 4 documentary series, Artist in Residence, in the episode entitled "The Football Club". It follows portrait artist Tai-Shan Schierenberg as he paints players, management and fans of the club.
A week after the season ended, Albion made the first presentations from their caps project. The blue caps feature the club's original crest from 1884 as well as a unique number denoting  the order of each player's league debut for the team. They will be given to every player—or where deceased, to surviving family members—to have represented West Bromwich Albion in league football. The first caps awarded honoured members of Albion's 1968 FA Cup-winning team.

References

External links
West Brom 2017/18 at Soccerbase

West Bromwich Albion
West Bromwich Albion F.C. seasons